Ascension Island is an island in the South Atlantic Ocean, part of the wider British overseas territory of Saint Helena, Ascension and Tristan da Cunha. Like other British Overseas Territories, it issues its own postage stamps, which provide a source of income for the island from sales to overseas collectors, as well as being used for domestic and international postage.

Early days
Originally mail was carried on an irregular basis as ships called. A datestamp was in use from February 1858, and in 1863 the Union Steamship Co. began regular carriage of mail, continuing until 1977. On 3 March 1867 British postage stamps became valid for Ascension mail and continued in use until 1922, when Ascension became a dependency of Saint Helena.

First stamps 
On 2 November 1922, nine stamps of St. Helena overprinted "ASCENSION" replaced British stamps. These were followed up in 1924 by a series of 12 using the St. Helena design but inscribed for Ascension. In 1934 a pictorial series of ten engraved stamps depicted various views of the island.

George VI 

In 1938 the pictorials were re-issued with a portrait of George VI replacing his father's image. Various colour and perforation changes ensued, with the last being issued in February 1953.

Queen Elizabeth 
A new definitive series of 13 in 1956 resembled the previous stamps, but was a little taller, and used maps and pictures of native animals in addition to local scenes. No further stamps were issued until 1963 when there was a series of 14 featuring birds.

From 1963 on, commemorative and special issues started to appear more frequently. In the 1990s the typical policy was to issue 5-6 sets per year, each consisting of 4–5 designs.

See also
Postage stamps and postal history of Saint Helena
Postage stamps and postal history of Tristan da Cunha

Sources 
Stanley Gibbons Ltd: various catalogues
 Encyclopaedia of Postal History
Rossiter, Stuart & John Flower. The Stamp Atlas. London: Macdonald, 1986.

Further reading 
 Attwood, J.H. Ascension: The Stamps and Postal History. London: Christie's-Robson Lowe, 1981 
 Attwood, John. Mail from Ascension. s.l.: The Author.
 Beale, P.O. Ascension Island's Post Office in the Second Half of the Nineteenth Century. s.l.: The British West Africa Study Circle, 1990
 Ford, Eric Harold. History and Postage Stamps of Ascension Island. Batley: H. Hayes, 1971 
 Leonard, John. The Postage Stamps of Ascension Island. London: Harris Publications Ltd., 1958
 Mueller, Michael D. and Peter P. McCann (editors). Thirty years of St. Helena, Ascension, and Tristan da Cunha philately: a collection of new, revised and reprinted articles published by the St. Helena, Ascension and Tristan da Cunha Philatelic Society on the occasion of the 30th anniversary of the founding of the society. Morgantown: St. Helena, Ascension and Tristan Da Cunha Philatelic Society, 2006 
 Proud, E. The Postal History of Ascension, St Helena and Tristan Da Cunha. Proud-Bailey Co. Ltd., 2005. 
 Skavaril, Russell V. (editor). St. Helena, Ascension, and Tristan da Cunha Philatelic Society's 20th anniversary anthology: original philatelic papers written by Society members to commemorate Society's 20th anniversary. Columbus, OH.: St. Helena, Ascension and Tristan Da Cunha Philatelic Society, 1997 
 Stanton, Ralph & Bill Thorpe. The George V Badge Issues of St. Helena and Ascension: a study of the printings and plate varieties. Princes Risborough: West Africa Study Circle, 2012

External links 
St. Helena, Ascension, and Tristan da Cunha Philatelic Society
 Ascension Study Circle

Philately of Ascension Island